William Raggio (October 30, 1926 – February 23, 2012) was an American politician and a former Republican member of the Nevada Senate. He represented Washoe County's 3rd district from 1972 until his retirement in 2011. He is the longest-serving member in the history of the State Senate.

Early life, education, and early career
Raggio was born in Reno, Nevada in 1926. He obtained his B.A. by attending Louisiana Tech University, University of Oklahoma, and University of Nevada, Reno, where he was a member of Alpha Tau Omega. He obtained his J.D. from the Hastings College of Law at the University of California and the Boalt Hall School of Law at University of California, Berkeley.

Raggio then joined the military. He was a member of the United States Navy Reserve (USNR) and became a Second Lieutenant of the United States Marine Corps Reserve (USMCR). Raggio started his legal career as an Assistant District Attorney of Washoe County (1952–1958) and was the D.A. of the county (1958–1970).

Political career

1970 U.S. Senate race

Raggio first ran for public office statewide in 1970 against incumbent Democrat U.S. Senator Howard Cannon, who defeated Raggio, the Republican nominee, with nearly 58% of the vote to serve a third term.

1974 Lieutenant Governor race
Incumbent Democratic Lieutenant Governor of Nevada Harry Reid decided not to run for another term, in order to run for the U.S. Senate. This left an open seat. Democrat nominee Robert E. Rose defeated Raggio, the Republican nominee, with an estimated 52% of the vote statewide.

State Senate tenure (1972–2011)
Raggio served 12 special and 19 regular sessions, the longest Senate service in Nevada history. He was Senate Minority Floor Leader in 1977–1979, 1983–1986, 1991, and 2009. He was Senate Majority Floor Leader in 1987–1989 and 1993–2007. He was Chairman of the Interim Senate Finance Committee in 1988–1990, 1993–1994, 1997–1998, and 2001–2002. He was Chairman of the Senate Finance Committee from 1987 to 1989 and 1993–2005. He was also Chairman of the Legislative Committee on Education from 1997 to 1999 and 2001–2003.

Death
On February 23, 2012, Raggio died at the age of 85 while on vacation in Sydney, Australia. His cause of death was reported as respiratory illness. Raggio fathered three children, Leslie, Tracy and Mark (d. 2004).

References

External links
Senator William J. Raggio official Nevada Legislature site
 
William J. Raggio at Jones Vargas law firm
William J. Raggio Papers, Special Collections, University Libraries, University of Nevada, Reno

1926 births
2012 deaths
Nevada lawyers
Republican Party Nevada state senators
District attorneys in Nevada
Politicians from Reno, Nevada
Candidates in the 1970 United States elections
University of California, Hastings College of the Law alumni
UC Berkeley School of Law alumni
Respiratory disease deaths in New South Wales
20th-century American lawyers
United States Navy reservists
United States Marine Corps officers
United States Marine Corps reservists
American people of Italian descent